Ecologic Brands Inc. is a company that specializes in creating eco-friendly packaging solutions for consumer products. The products are made from sustainable materials and are designed to be recyclable or compostable. The company also provide branding and marketing services to help companies promote their environmentally conscious products.

History 
Ecologic Brands was founded in May 2008, when entrepreneur Julie Corbett saw an opportunity to create an eco-friendly bottle to replace the ubiquitous rigid plastic containers and laminated paperboard cartons her family and community consumed. Growing up in Montreal, Julie's inspiration was the Canadian milk pouch, a clear light-weight pouch of milk that is placed in a re-usable plastic carafe. She set out to create her own version of the Canadian milk pouch – a bottle that would minimize the use of plastic while maintaining functionality and convenience. The idea of a molded fiber shell came to Corbett when she opened the box her new iPhone came in, and the iPhone was nestled on a smooth, sturdy molded fiber tray. Corbett saw the opportunity to use molded fiber to shape a bottle, with a thin pouch inside.

Pulling from her knowledge of pulp and paper, Corbett designed a bottle that combines a rigid outer pulp shell (made mainly from old corrugated cardboard boxes or “OCC”) with a thin inner plastic liner and re-sealable cap.  She patented her technology and began to explore the market opportunity for her innovation.  The bottle evolved into an eco-friendly replacement for milk, juice, laundry detergent, household cleaning products and other high volume liquid categories.

Ecologic's commercial introduction came in January 2010 when the company partnered with Straus Family Creamery for its first market test at Whole Foods Market in Northern California. The Ecologic bottle was used to package Straus Family Creamery's Fat Free Milk and was featured next to Straus' other dairy products for 6 weeks. During that time, Straus’ Fat Free milk experienced 72% lift with only one Ecologic shelf facing and Fat Free milk in the Ecologic bottle became the second best selling Straus SKU (stock-keeping unit).

Ecologic's second customer, Seventh Generation, is a brand of non-toxic household and personal care products. Together they launched Seventh Generation Natural 4X Laundry Detergent on March 9, 2011. The Natural 4X Laundry Detergent is available on natural retailer shelves throughout the country. The company received press attention with this announcement, including a story in USA TODAY.

Products 

The Ecologic bottle uses proprietary technology to combine a rigid molded pulp outer shell with a thin plastic inner liner and re-sealable cap. The molded fiber shell is made from 100% post-consumer recycled material and is 100% compostable or re-recyclable with paper. The inner liner is made of #2 or #4 BPA-free plastic and uses up to 70% less plastic than comparable plastic jugs. The Ecologic bottle can be customized to a brand's specifications. Bottles are disposed by pulling open the shell to separate the two components.

The Ecologic bottle aims to replace rigid plastic containers, laminated cardboard and glass for brands in categories such as:
 Beverages (dairy, soy milk, juice, wine)
 Home Cleaning & Laundry
 Food Containers (yogurt, condiments, oils & vinegars)
 Cosmetics

References

External links 
 
 Interview with Julie Corbett on GreenBiz Radio

Manufacturing companies based in California
2008 establishments in California